Avant Window Navigator (abbreviated AWN or Awn) is a dock-like bar for Linux, which sits on an edge of a user's screen and tracks open windows. Instead of representing open windows as buttons or segments on a bar, it uses large icons on a translucent background to increase readability and add visual appeal. The program was created by Neil J. Patel.

Both the appearance and functionality of Avant Window Navigator may be customized, and plugins and applets are available, such as to display the progress of a download in Mozilla Firefox or to control a music player like Rhythmbox.  The plugins use the D-Bus IPC system, and applets can be written in C, Python or Vala. A sister project, AWN Extras, is a collection of community-contributed applets and plugins.  Releases are usually kept in sync with AWN.

One of the major requirements to run older versions of Avant Window Navigator is a compositing window manager. At least version 0.4.0-2 in the Debian repos has either Metacity, xcompmgr, Compiz, xfwm4, KWin or Mutter as a dependency.

Therefore, the user was required to install a compositor, which could tax performance on low-end systems. Some alternatives were to use a lightweight desktop environment such as Xfce, which has a compositing manager since version 4.2.0, or to enable compositing in Metacity when using GNOME. However, support for non-composited environments is available in version 0.4.0.

See also 

Dock (computing)
Docky
Kicker (KDE)
GNOME Panel

References

Notes
 Jack Wallen (12 Aug 2009) Avant Window Navigator: OS X-like dock on Linux desktop, ghacks.net
 Dmitri Popov (Jan 30,  2009) Managing Tasks with Avant Window Navigator, Linux Magazine online
 Jonathan Roberts (21 July 2007) Gnome Panel Mania, Free Software Magazine column

External links

 - Home of AWN project - Maintained by Povilas Kanapickas (reporting of bugs and issues not permitted, last activity 2014-06-11)
 - Project moved to GitHub
AWN Wiki contains, among other things, installation instructions and a list of FAQs - Site Unknown (as of 2014-12-13)
AWN Forums - Access to server forbidden (as of 2014-12-13)
Avant Window Navigator (AWN) Mac OS like Dock in openSUSE at susegeek.com (posting dated 2008-08-02)
Neil J. Patel's Blog - Blog no longer active (last entry dated 2011-06-12)
Planet AWN, an aggregation of the developers' weblogs - Site Unknown (as of 2014-12-13)

Application launchers
Applications using D-Bus
Beta software
Free software programmed in C
Free software programmed in Python
Free software programmed in Vala
Graphical shells that use GTK
Software that uses PyGTK